Daniel Mark (Woody) Woodgate (born 19 October 1960) is an English musician, songwriter, composer and record producer. In a career spanning more than 30 years, Woodgate came to prominence in the late 1970s as the drummer for the English ska band Madness and went on to become a member of the Anglo-American alternative rock band Voice of the Beehive in the late 1980s. Woodgate began his solo career in 2015, while still a member of Madness, releasing the album In Your Mind.

Early years
Daniel Mark Woodgate was born on 19 October 1960, in Kensington, west London, England. As children, he and his younger brother Nick lived with their divorcee father in a big house in Camden Town, north London and were cared for by nannies. Dan Woodgate attended Haverstock School from 1972–1978. After leaving school, he worked for a time as a sign writer/printer and then as a building work/labourer.

Woodgate received his first drum kit when he was 12 years of age. When he was 14, he and Nick started their first band called Steel Erection. Interviewed by the Daily Express in 2013, Woodgate recalled: "We were really close and spent every hour of every day together. When Nick was about 10, dad realised he had a real talent for playing the guitar. I couldn't play a thing so I took up the drums and we formed a band together called Steel Erection." The two went on to play in other bands.

Nick and Dan Woodgate continued to have associated music careers. Nick is credited as a co-writer on the Madness songs "No Money", "Kitchen Floor" and "Leon". He also played all the instruments minus drums and provided vocals for the demo version of "Kitchen Floor".

Madness

Woodgate encountered Madness after being introduced at a rehearsal by their bass guitarist Mark Bedford. In 1978 he joined the band, replacing Gavin Rodgers. After briefly changing their name to Morris and the Minors, the band renamed itself as Madness in 1979.

Madness went on to achieve most of their success in the early to mid-1980s. The band spent 214 weeks on the UK Singles Chart during that decade, holding the record for most weeks spent by a group in the 1980s UK Singles Chart. Since forming, Madness have had 15 singles reach the UK Top 10. One of these is the UK number-one single ("House of Fun") and two were number-ones in Ireland, "House of Fun" and "Wings of a Dove".

Woodgate is one of the less regular songwriters in the band, but is credited as co-writer on the hits "The Return of the Los Palmas 7" and "Michael Caine", as well as on the 2009 single "Dust Devil", which reached #64. He is the sole credit on "Sunday Morning" from The Rise & Fall album, and "Small World" on Oui Oui Si Si Ja Ja Da Da.

Voice of the Beehive

Woodgate also played drums with Voice of the Beehive. American sisters Tracey Belland (vocals/guitar) and Melissa Belland (vocals) formed the band in 1986 with Woodgate and fellow British members Martin Brett (bass guitar) and Mike Jones (guitar). Woodgate's Madness bandmate Mark Bedford also participated in the group during its formative stages.  The band had initial success in the UK, US and Australia, releasing five Top 40 singles from two albums in the UK.

Their biggest commercial success was with the singles, "Don't Call Me Baby", "Monsters and Angels", "I Think I Love You", "I Walk The Earth" and "I Say Nothing" from their first two albums Let It Bee and Honey Lingers. In 1996, the band released a third album Sex & Misery and then disbanded. The band reformed in 2003 and played a two-week UK tour. In 2008 they released tracks from the tour on a live CD titled "Don't Call Me Baby."

Later career
From 1992–95 Woodgate worked with his own band Fat, playing clubs in England, France and the US. He signed to London Records and released the single "Downtime."

In 2014, the Magic Brothers, Woodgate’s duo with his brother Nick, released an album titled The Magic Line on Woodgate's DW Records label. The album was dedicated to the brothers' father Crispin Woodgate.

On 1 June 2015, Woodgate released a solo debut In Your Mind on the DW Records label. The album began life as the second release for the Magic Brothers but eventually became more of a solo project for Woodgate. Guest vocalists on the album include Woodgate's wife Siobhan and the Velveteen Orkestra's singer Dan Shears.

Personal life
Woodgate was previously married to Jane Crockford of the Mo-dettes, but remarried in 1997 and has two children. In 2009, he completed the London Marathon in a time of 3 hours and 45 minutes.

Woodgate's brother Nick has struggled with schizophrenia and in 2013 Woodgate became an ambassador for the charity Rethink Mental Illness.

Discography

Studio album
In Your Mind (2015)

Single
"In Your Mind" (2015)

References

External links
 
 

1960 births
Living people
British male drummers
English drummers
Madness (band) members
English songwriters
English record producers
20th-century English musicians
English reggae musicians
British ska musicians
New wave drummers